Strunga is a commune in Iași County, Western Moldavia, Romania. It is situated 55 km from Iași city. It is composed of eight villages: Brătulești, Crivești, Cucova, Fărcășeni, Fedeleșeni, Gura Văii, Hăbășești and Strunga.

At the 2002 census, 100% of inhabitants were ethnic Romanians. 55.3% were Romanian Orthodox, 43.8% Roman Catholic and 0.6% Seventh-day Adventist.

Today Strunga is a resort of local interest. Its mineral waters can be used in the treatment of many diseases.

Natives
 Ion Manolescu-Strunga
 Iacob Zadik

References

Communes in Iași County
Localities in Western Moldavia